Pilar Hidalgo Iglesias (born May 3, 1979 in Cee, A Coruña) is a female athlete from Spain, who competes in triathlon.

Hidalgo competed at the second Olympic triathlon at the 2004 Summer Olympics.  She took thirteenth place with a total time of 2:07:37.34.

References
 Profile

1979 births
Living people
Spanish female triathletes
Triathletes at the 2004 Summer Olympics
Olympic triathletes of Spain